Jens Smedegaard Hansen (born 16 June 1957) is a Danish sprinter. He competed in the men's 400 metres at the 1980 Summer Olympics.

References

1957 births
Living people
Athletes (track and field) at the 1980 Summer Olympics
Danish male sprinters
Olympic athletes of Denmark
Place of birth missing (living people)